The New-York Spectator was an American newspaper published in New York City under several different names from 1797 to 1876.

Chronology of names
 1797: The Spectator
 1804: New-York Spectator
 1867: New York Spectator and Weekly Commercial Advertiser
 2018: The New-York Spectator

References

Defunct newspapers published in New York City